The Acer beTouch E120 is an Internet-enabled smartphone by Acer Inc that uses Android 1.6 operating system. It was officially presented at Computex 2010 in Tapei and it looks very similar to Acer beTouch E130

Main features 
The Acer beTouch E120 is an Android phone running version 1.6 and it packs a 2.8-inch touchscreen, a 3.2 -megapixel camera, and the processor is powered by a ST Ericsson at 416 MHz. 
One of the main differences with the Acer beTouch E130 – is that the latter comes with a QWERTY keyboard . The smartphone includes WiFi, GPS, Bluetooth and radio.

See also
List of Android devices
Galaxy Nexus

References

External links
 Acer Smartphones overview
 Acer beTouch E120 Official Site

Android (operating system) devices
beTouch E120
Mobile phones introduced in 2010